This is a list of warm-up matches for the 2017 ICC Champions Trophy.

The matches took place at two of the grounds to be used for the main tournament (Edgbaston and The Oval) between 26–30 May 2017.
England and South Africa played a bilateral ODI series at the same time so did not take part, leaving the each of the other 6 qualified teams to play the other 2 teams not in their Champions Trophy group. These warm-up matches had rules that were slightly different from normal, so are not recognised as ODIs. A team could use up to 15 players in a match, but only 11 could bat (or field at any one time) in each innings.

Matches

References

2017 ICC Champions Trophy